Zabrus humeralis is a species of ground beetle in the Epomidozabrus subgenus that is endemic to Portugal.

References

Beetles described in 1904
Beetles of Europe
Endemic arthropods of Portugal
Zabrus